Sphaerocera curvipes is a species of lesser dung flies, insects in the family Sphaeroceridae.

References

External links

 

Sphaeroceridae
Articles created by Qbugbot
Insects described in 1805